Corey Grant (born December 19, 1991) is a former American football running back. He played college football at Auburn. He signed with the Jacksonville Jaguars as an undrafted free agent in 2015.

Early years
Grant attended Opelika High School, where he played high school football. He was ranked a four-star prospect by Rivals.com and Scout.com. Grant was rated as the fifth best all-purpose running back by Rivals.com.

College career
Grant originally signed with and attended the University of Alabama, where he redshirted for the 2010 season. He would then transfer to Auburn University in 2011, having to sit out the 2011 season per NCAA transfer rules. Grant later attended and played at Auburn through the 2014 season. In the 2012 season, he had a limited role with nine carries for 29 yards. In the 2013 season opener against Washington State, he had 146 rushing yards and a rushing touchdown. On November 9, against Tennessee, he had a 90-yard kick return for a touchdown. Overall, he finished the 2013 season with 647 rushing yards and six touchdowns. In the 2014 season, he finished with 60 carries for 364 rushing yards and three rushing touchdowns to go along with 10 receptions for 92 yards and a receiving touchdown.

Collegiate statistics

Professional career

Jacksonville Jaguars
On May 2, 2015, Grant signed with the Jacksonville Jaguars following the conclusion of the 2015 NFL Draft as an undrafted free agent. In his rookie season, Grant ran for 2 yards on 6 carries, and had 2 receptions for 13 yards before being placed on injured reserve on October 20, 2015 after suffering a hip injury.

On September 18, 2016, Grant caught his first career touchdown against the San Diego Chargers. On January 1, 2017, Grant ran for 122 yards and a touchdown including a 57-yard touchdown run against the Indianapolis Colts. He finished his 2016 campaign running for 164 yards and a touchdown, as well as four catches for 35 yards and a touchdown.

On August 10, 2017, Grant ran for 120 yards and a touchdown including a 79-yard touchdown run in the preseason opener against the New England Patriots. Overall, he finished the 2017 season with 30 carries for 248 yards and two touchdowns.

On March 12, 2018, the Jaguars placed a second-round restricted free agent tender on Grant. On March 22, 2018, Grant signed his tender to remain with the Jaguars. He was placed on injured reserve on October 9, 2018 after suffering a Lisfranc injury in Week 5, ending his season. He finished the 2018 season with 40 rushing yards on 13 carries and nine receptions for 67 receiving yards.

Green Bay Packers
On July 26, 2019, Grant signed with the Green Bay Packers. He was released on August 8, 2019.

References

External links
Auburn Tigers bio
Jacksonville Jaguars bio

1991 births
Living people
American football return specialists
American football running backs
Auburn Tigers football players
Green Bay Packers players
Jacksonville Jaguars players
People from Opelika, Alabama
Players of American football from Alabama